Edward Hatton may refer to:

Edward Anthony Hatton (1701–1783), English Dominican apologist
Edward Hatton (footballer), English footballer who played for Reading and Thames Ironworks as a centre forward
Edward Hatton (surveyor) (c. 1644 – after 1733), English surveyor